The rial (sign: ﷼; abbreviation: YRl (singular) and YRls (plural) in Latin, ,ر.ي in Arabic; ISO code: YER) is the official currency of the Republic of Yemen. It is technically divided into 100 fils, although coins denominated in fils have not been issued since Yemeni unification. Due to the ongoing political instability, the value of Yemeni rial continues to fall.

The Yemeni Civil War has caused the currency to diverge. In southern Yemen, which is primarily controlled by UAE-backed separatists and the former government backed by Saudi Arabia, ongoing printing has caused the currency to plummet into freefall. In northern Yemen, which is primarily controlled by Ansar Allah with support from Iran, banknotes printed after 2017 are not considered legal tender, and therefore, the exchange rate has remained stable. The differences in banknotes printed before and after 2017 can be determined by its size.

History
In the 18th and 19th century, the riyal was traditionally associated with the Maria Theresa thaler, a currency that was widely in use in Yemen owing to the Mocha coffee trade with the French, and a Yemeni request that its produce be paid with thalers.

As Yemen progressed, it developed its own legal currency. After the union between the North (the Yemen Arab Republic) and the South (the People's Democratic Republic of Yemen) in 1990, both the northern rial and the southern dinar remained legal tender during a transitional period, with 1 dinar exchanged for 26 rials. On 11 June 1996, the dinar was withdrawn from circulation. In 1993, the first coins were issued for the Republic of Yemen. The value of the Yemeni rial against the United States dollar dropped significantly, compared to 12.01 rials per dollar in early the 1990s. Since the mid-1990s, the Yemeni rial has been freely convertible. Though it dropped from YRls 20 to approximately YRls 215 against the US dollar since then, the rial has been stable for several years. However, since 2010 the Central Bank of Yemen had to intervene many times, resulting in a serious decline of foreign reserves. By late 2013, the Economic Intelligence Unit expects reserves to decline to approximately 1.3 months of imports over the following years, despite information that Saudi Arabia would transfer $1 billion to the Yemeni Central Bank. Due to the war, the exchange rate for the Yemeni rial has hovered between 470 and 500 Yemeni rials for 1 US dollar.

Coins
When Yemen unified, coins had been issued in North Yemen in denominations of 1, 5, 10, 25 and 50 fils and 1 rial. The fils denominations have all disappeared from circulation. In 1993, new coins were introduced by the Central Bank of Yemen in denominations of 1 and 5 rials. These were followed by coins of 10 rials in 1995 and 20 rials in 2004.

Banknotes
At the time of unification, Central Bank of Yemen notes in circulation were 1, 5, 10, 20, 50, and 100 rials. In 1993, the 1 and 5 rial notes were replaced by coins, with the same happening to the 10 rial notes in 1995. In 1996, 200 rials notes were introduced, followed by 500 rials in 1997 and 1,000 rials in 1998. The 20 rial notes were replaced by coins in 2004. In addition, a 250 rial banknote was issued on November 14, 2009. In 2017, the Central Bank of Yemen, now relocated in Aden, its interim capital due to the civil war, issued 500 and 1,000 rial banknotes with revised security features and different size dimensions. In 2018, the Central Bank of Yemen reintroduced the 200 rial banknote and has issued a new 100 rial banknote.

See also
 Economy of Yemen
 Ahmed A AL-Samawi

References

Sources

External links

Economy of Yemen
Currencies introduced in 1993
Currencies of Yemen